Owch Bolagh (also Romanized as Owch Bolāgh; also known as Owch Bolāghī and Ūch Bolāghī) is a village in Charuymaq-e Jonubesharqi Rural District, Shadian District, Charuymaq County, East Azerbaijan Province, Iran. At the 2006 census, its population was 29, in 6 families.

References 

Populated places in Charuymaq County